Charles E. "Chick" Evans Jr. (July 18, 1890 – November 6, 1979) was an American amateur golfer of the 1910s and 1920s. Evans, who won the 1910 Western Open, became the first amateur to win both the U.S. Open and U.S. Amateur in one year, a feat he achieved in 1916. Evans won the U.S. Amateur again in 1920, and was runner-up three times. Selected to the Walker Cup team in 1922, 1924, and 1928, he competed in a record 50 consecutive U.S. Amateurs in his long career. Evans achieved all of this while carrying only seven hickory-shafted clubs.

In addition to his golf career, Evans is known for founding the Evans Scholars Foundation, which provides a college scholarship for qualified caddies.

In 1960, Evans was voted the Bob Jones Award, the highest honor given by the United States Golf Association in recognition of distinguished sportsmanship in golf. He is a member of the World Golf Hall of Fame.

Early life
Born in Indianapolis, Indiana, Evans' family moved to Chicago when he was eight years old, and he grew up on the north side of the city. His father, Charles Evans, was one of the most influential librarians of the 20th century. At the age of eight, he was first exposed to golf as a caddie at a Chicago course, the Edgewater Golf Club. He attended secondary school at the Evanston Academy, and won the 1907 and 1908 Western Interscholastic tournaments. He led  in the founding of the Western Interscholastic Golf Association (WIGA), and led Evanston Academy to the 1908 WIGA team championship.

Golf career

From these beginnings, Evans became one of the most acclaimed American amateur golfers of his time. The accomplishment that gave him the most contemporary publicity came in 1916, when he won both the U.S. Amateur and U.S. Open in the same year. Evans was the first person to accomplish this task, and only Bobby Jones has done it since.

Evans also won the Western Open in 1910 by defeating George Simpson 6 and 5 in the 36-hole final. He was the only amateur to do so until Scott Verplank in 1985. Simpson graciously praised Evans on his victory, saying “I’ve learned the greatest golf lesson of my life today.  I consider it a greater honor to be beaten by the kind of golf you have played than to have remained out of the tournament because I did not fancy match play.”

Into the 1960s, Evans was an active participant in senior tournaments, and still competed in U.S. Amateur events, eventually setting a record of completing 50 of these championships. Evans played his last rounds of competitive golf in 1968, winning the Illinois Open that year. His last Western Amateur was in 1967.

After his retirement, Evans continued to attend events as a spectator and converse with the fans and players.

Evans Scholars Foundation

After his wins in 1916, Evans was given several thousand dollars in royalties for recording golf instructions for the Brunswick Record Company, and in 1921 he received royalties from a golf book. If he had accepted this money Evans would have lost his amateur status. His mother suggested that he put the money to good use by sponsoring a scholarship fund for caddies.

Evans, who was unable to finish his own matriculation at Northwestern University, recalled that his mother "wouldn't think of accepting my money unless we could arrange it to be trusted to furnish educations for deserving qualified caddies." He said his mother "pointed out that the money came from golf and thus should go back into golf -- It was all her dream -- her idea."

Evans went to the Western Golf Association (WGA), an organization that ran the golf championships in the Midwest, to get their support for his scholarship. By 1930, the Evans Scholars Foundation had formed and two caddies, Harold Fink and Jim McGinnis, were named the first two Evans Scholars.

Chick Evans' long friendship with Chicago tax attorney, Carleton Blunt, had proved to be the catalyst for launching the Evans Scholars Foundation. Blunt, an avid golfer and philanthropist, supported Evans' vision for helping caddies attend colleges and universities across the country by raising the necessary funds for decades.

The criteria used to choose the recipients were scholarship, fellowship and leadership. Since that time, over 10,600 caddies have become Evans Scholars and attained college educations. The Evans scholarship program continues today as the largest scholarship organization in sports and the largest privately funded scholarship program in the United States.

Evans Scholarship houses exist at the following Universities: University of Colorado, University of Illinois, Northwestern University, Marquette University, University of Wisconsin, Purdue University, Ohio State University, Northern Illinois University, University of Missouri, Indiana University, University of Michigan, Michigan State University, Miami University and the University of Minnesota.

On February 19, 2014 the Evans Scholars Foundation announced their plans to build a new chapter house at the University of Oregon. It is the first new Scholarship House in 27 years. In addition to those universities at which houses exist, scholarship recipients attend several other universities around the country. More than 800 caddies currently attend college on an Evans Scholarship.

Death and legacy
Evans died on November 6, 1979 at age 89. His wife, Esther, had died in 1967 after 40 years of marriage. They had no children. The Chick Evans Golf Course in Morton Grove, a north suburb of Chicago, is named in his honor.

Tournament wins (22)
1907 Chicago Amateur, Western Junior, Western Interscholastic
1908 Chicago Amateur, Western Interscholastic
1909 Western Amateur
1910 Western Open
1911 French Amateur, North and South Amateur, Chicago Amateur
1912 Western Amateur
1914 Western Amateur, Chicago District Amateur
1915 Western Amateur
1916 U.S. Open, U.S. Amateur
1920 U.S. Amateur, Western Amateur
1921 Western Amateur
1922 Western Amateur
1923 Western Amateur
1925 Kansas City Open

Professional major championships

Wins (1)

Results timeline
Note: As an amateur, Evans was ineligible to play in the PGA Championship.

LA = Low amateur
NYF = Tournament not yet founded
NT = No tournament
CUT = missed the half-way cut
"T" indicates a tie for a place

Amateur major championships

Wins (2)

Results timeline

M = Medalist
DNQ = Did not qualify for match play portion
R256, R128, R64, R32, R16, QF, SF = Round in which player lost in match play

Sources: Amateur Championship: 1911, 1914, 1921, 1926, 1946, 1949, 1950, 1952, 1953, 1955

U.S. national team appearances
Amateur
Walker Cup: 1922 (winners), 1924 (winners), 1928 (winners)

References

External links

 
 USGA – Looking Back: 1916 U.S. Amateur at Merion
 
 Official Site of the Western Golf Association/Evans Scholars Foundation
 Evans Scholarship Chapters

American male golfers
Amateur golfers
Winners of men's major golf championships
World Golf Hall of Fame inductees
Golfers from Indiana
Golfers from Chicago
Northwestern University alumni
Sportspeople from Indianapolis
1890 births
1979 deaths